Douglas Louis Sydnor (December 28, 1919 – July 29, 1969) was an American Negro league outfielder in the 1940s.

A native of West Point, Virginia, Sydnor made his Negro leagues debut in 1943 with the New York Cubans and New York Black Yankees. He played for the Black Yankees again the following season. Sydnor died in his hometown of West Point in 1969 at age 49.

References

External links
 and Seamheads

1919 births
1969 deaths
New York Black Yankees players
New York Cubans players
Baseball outfielders
Baseball players from Virginia
People from West Point, Virginia
20th-century African-American sportspeople
21st-century African-American people